Outwoods is a civil parish in the English county of Staffordshire. Once a village it is now a suburb on the flanks of the town of Burton upon Trent separated from the town by the A38 road.

Geography
Outwoods is located roughly north-west of Burton town centre and west of the suburb of Horninglow. In common with the town Outwoods forms part of the district of East Staffordshire.

See also
Listed buildings in Outwoods, East Staffordshire

References

External links 

Borough of East Staffordshire
Civil parishes in Staffordshire